Mike Dean (born 2 June 1968) is a former English professional football referee and currently a video assistant referee (VAR) primarily in the Premier League. He is based in Heswall, Wirral, in North West England, and is a member of the Cheshire County Football Association.

Since his appointment as a Select Group referee in 2000, Dean has officiated a number of notable matches, including the FA Community Shield and the finals of the FA Cup, Football League Cup and FA Trophy.

Career

Early career
Dean began refereeing in 1985. He progressed to officiate in the Northern Premier League as a referee, becoming a Football League assistant referee in 1995 and being promoted to the full referees' list in 1997.

Professional career
Dean was appointed to the Select Group of referees for the Premier League in 2000, being subsequently promoted to the FIFA international referees' list in 2003. Also in 2003, he was fourth official to Graham Barber at the FA Cup final held at Cardiff's Millennium Stadium, where Arsenal beat Southampton 1–0.

Dean took control of the 2004 FA Community Shield match between Arsenal and Manchester United at the Millennium Stadium, a game which Arsenal won 3–1. He also refereed the FA Trophy final of that year.

Dean was originally appointed to referee the 2006 FA Cup final at the Millennium Stadium on 13 May 2006 but the Football Association later replaced him with Alan Wiley after concerns were raised about Dean's ability to be impartial towards Liverpool, who are based near his hometown in Wirral. Dean made it to the Millennium Stadium eight days later though, when he refereed the Championship play-off final between Leeds United and Watford.

Dean's highest refereeing honour came on 17 May 2008 when he took charge of that year's FA Cup final between Portsmouth and Cardiff City, with Trevor Massey and Martin Yerby as his assistants and Chris Foy as the fourth official. Dean issued three cautions during the match at Wembley Stadium, which was won 1–0 by Portsmouth.

On 5 April 2009, in a South Wales derby between Cardiff City and Swansea City, Dean suffered a cut to the forehead resulting from what appeared to be a coin thrown by a Cardiff supporter. He later awarded Cardiff a penalty kick, which was converted to earn a draw for the home side. Cardiff's chairman Peter Ridsdale condemned the attack and said that the supporter would be given a lifelong ban if found guilty. A 24-year-old man was later convicted over the incident and given a three-year ban and £200 fine. No action was taken by the Football Association of Wales against Cardiff City.

On 31 January 2011, Dean was appointed to referee the 2011 League Cup final between Arsenal and Birmingham City. Birmingham won the match 2–1, with an 89th-minute winning goal by Obafemi Martins. The Blues had taken the lead through Nikola Žigić, before Robin van Persie equalised for Arsenal. Dean issued five yellow cards during the course of the final.

In January 2017, Dean was criticised after giving a straight red card to West Ham midfielder Sofiane Feghouli for a coming together with Manchester United defender Phil Jones, after which Jones writhed on the floor in apparent pain. The red card came after only 15 minutes and with the score at 0–0; Manchester United eventually won the game 2–0. Replays suggested that it was in fact Jones who had committed a dangerous challenge on Feghouli and was himself lucky not to have been sent off. Feghouli's red card was later rescinded.

On 2 April 2019, during a game between Wolverhampton Wanderers and Manchester United at Molineux, Dean issued the 100th red card of his career as a Premier League referee to Manchester United's Ashley Young, making Dean the first referee in Premier League history to reach the 100 red cards milestone.

In February 2021, Dean and his family received bomb threats following two controversial decisions which saw Dean give a red card to Southampton’s Jan Bednarek and West Ham’s Tomáš Souček in successive games, and asked not to officiate the following weekend Premier League fixtures. Both red cards were rescinded by the FA.

Dean made a cameo appearance as himself in Season 2, Episode 8 of the American television series Ted Lasso.

Dean's retirement was made known on 21 March 2022. He refereed his final game on Matchday 38 of the 2021–22 Premier League season. Chelsea won 2–1 against Watford in this game.

On 16 August 2022, Dean was dropped as a video assistant referee (VAR) for a single round in the 2022–23 Premier League season after a controversial performance during a league fixture the day prior between Chelsea and Tottenham. The controversy surrounds Tottenham's first equaliser by Pierre-Emile Hojbjerg, first on his potential foul on Chelsea's Kai Havertz and subsequently his shot that led to the goal, with Tottenham's Richarlison standing in an offside position and potentially blocking Chelsea's Edouard Mendy line of vision. The other was Tottenham's Cristian Romero's hair pull on Chelsea's Marc Cucurella at the final moments of the game, a disallowed action that was reviewed by Dean as not being a foul, leading to Spurs' late equaliser by Harry Kane in the subsequent corner. Two days later on 18 August, Dean personally admitted his mistake in regards to the incident, adding that he should had asked Anthony Taylor, the referee during the fixture, to review the hair pull on the pitch-side monitor instead of carrying on.

European and international matches
Dean first international match came in 2004 when he was appointed to a friendly between the Netherlands and Republic of Ireland at the Amsterdam Arena. The away side won 1–0 thanks to a Robbie Keane goal.

On 30 September 2010, Dean refereed a Europa League group stage match between Borussia Dortmund and Sevilla. Early in the second half he showed a second yellow card to Dortmund player Marcel Schmelzer for diving.

Dean has also officiated European Championship qualifying matches. His first appointment was to the Euro 2008 group F qualifier between Iceland and Latvia on 13 October 2007. The game in the Icelandic capital Reykjavík ended with a 4–2 win for the visitors. Dean's next European Championship match was on 12 October 2010 when he oversaw a group A qualifier for Euro 2012 between Belgium and Austria in Brussels. The away team appeared to have secured a 3–2 victory but two Belgium goals on 87 and 89 minutes overturned that scoreline, only for ten-man Austria to score an injury-time equaliser to earn a 4–4 draw.

Dean stepped down from the FIFA international list at the end of 2013 at the mandatory retirement age of 45.

Personal life
Dean was born in Wirral, England, and played football as a goalkeeper in his Primary School. Dean pulled out of his school at age 18 and, soon after expressing his gain in weight, came into refereeing. He has been a supporter of Tranmere Rovers since childhood.

Statistics

*updated as of 2021–22 season

Statistics are for all competitions. No records are available prior to 1997–98.

See also
List of football referees

References

External links

Mike Dean Profile at Refworld.com
Mike Dean Referee Statistics at soccerbase.com
 Refs Corner: Mike Dean at the Football Association
Profile on RateTheRef.net

1968 births
Living people
English football referees
People from Heswall
FA Cup Final referees
English Football League referees
Premier League referees
Victims of bomb threats